Hanne Erika Sikiö (born 19 March 1978) is a Finnish retired ice hockey player. She represented  in the women's ice hockey tournament at the 2002 Winter Olympics and at three IIHF Women's World Championship tournaments, winning bronze in 1999 and 2000. 

Sikiö played four seasons with the Minnesota Duluth Bulldogs women's ice hockey program, from 1999 to 2003, making her one of the earliest Finns in North American collegiate women's ice hockey,

Career stats

Minnesota Duluth Bulldogs

Salt Lake 2002

References

External links 

 
 
 

1978 births
Living people
Finnish women's ice hockey forwards
HPK Kiekkonaiset players
Tappara players
Ilves Naiset players
Minnesota Duluth Bulldogs women's ice hockey players
JYP Jyväskylä Naiset players
Ice hockey players at the 2002 Winter Olympics
Olympic ice hockey players of Finland
Sportspeople from Pirkanmaa
Tappara Naiset players